Oldřich Teplý (born 27 May 1940) is a Czech speed skater. He competed in three events at the 1964 Winter Olympics.

References

1940 births
Living people
Czech male speed skaters
Olympic speed skaters of Czechoslovakia
Speed skaters at the 1964 Winter Olympics
Sportspeople from Prague